Erwin Saul Hamburger (June 17, 1921 – May 19, 2002), known professionally as Earl Hammond, was an American actor who appeared in several films and television series.

Career
Earl Hammond began acting in radio at the age of 7, and continued working in that venue throughout his life. In 1938, after graduating from Bennet High School in Buffalo, New York, Hammond began acting in Fred and Ethel Dampier's radio skits on WGR, one of the city's major radio stations.  He moved on to California, studied acting at Los Angeles City College, and graduated in 1941 with future stars Donna Reed and Alexis Smith among his classmates.  He was drafted into the U.S. Army for World War II. After he was discharged, he moved to New York City, where he performed in the late 1940s on radio dramas, in summer theater, and in off-Broadway theater productions. 

In the 1940s, he had a regular role as a young lawyer on a radio soap opera. He acted on the CBS Radio Mystery Theater from 1974 to 1982, appearing in 189 episodes -- more than 12% of the entire run of the 1,399 episodes of that radio series. 

Hammond started his television career in the early 1950s, his first major role being as a regular called Sergeant Lane on the DuMont police drama Inside Detective (aka Rocky King Detective). At the same time, he also was the first of three actors to portray the title character in the short-lived ABC TV science-fiction adventure series Buck Rogers, which ran from April 15, 1950, to January 30, 1951.  In the mid-1950s, he had a major role in the daily/noontime CBS television soap opera Valiant Lady as Hal Soames, the married love interest of the widowed title character.

Hammond was perhaps best remembered for providing the voices of Mumm-Ra, Jaga, and other characters on the 1980s animated TV series ThunderCats, and for being the voice of villain Mon*Star on the 1980s animated TV series Silverhawks. He also was the voice of the Transformers villain Megatron in a series of children's read-along books.

In 1994, Hammond was selected from among several hundred actors who auditioned to be the voice of Pope John Paul II on the audiotape version of the Random House book Crossing the Threshold of Hope.   The publisher said the pope personally selected Hammond.

Personal life and death
Earl Hammond was born Erwin Saul Hamburger on June 17, 1921 in New York City, NY — his family moved to Buffalo, NY while he was still a toddler.  He began his acting career in radio at the age of 7, and continued all the way through high school.  In the early 1940s, he moved to California, took acting classes at Los Angeles City College, and changed his name to Earl Hammond.

He was drafted into the US Army during World War Two, learned Morse code, and served in communications.  Once discharged, he moved to New York City.

In the late 1950s, as more and more television production moved from New York City to California, so did he, who, based on his television series credits, likely moved to the West Coast around 1960. He married sometime between 1950 and 1980, and had a son and a daughter, both still living at the time of his death by heart failure on May 19, 2002, in New York City.

Filmography

Television
 Inside Detective ( Rocky King, Inside Detective TV series .... Sergeant Lane (1950–1953)
 Buck Rogers (1950) TV series .... Buck Rogers
 The Ad-Libbers (1951) TV game show .... Panelist 
 Robert Montgomery Presents (1 episode)
 Our Hearts Were Young and Gay (1954) .... Henri
 Captain Video and His Video Rangers (1 episode)
 Tobor's Return (1954) .... Ranger Colt
 Valiant Lady (1953) TV series .... Hal Soames (1954–1955)
 The Clear Horizon (1960) TV series .... Captain Sovine
 Bronco (1 episode)
 Moment of Doubt (1962) .... Mercer
 Maverick (1 episode)
 Marshal Maverick (1962).... Billy Coe
 The Many Loves of Dobie Gillis (1 episode)
 There's a Broken Light for Every Heart on Broadway (1963) .... Nightclub manager
 77 Sunset Strip (1 episode)
 Walk Among Tigers (1963) .... Conley
 The Gallant Men (1 episode)
 Operation Secret (1963) .... David Storm
 Directions (1 episode)
 Prologue to Christmas (1964) .... George
 The Space Giants (1967) (alternate language version of Japanese production "Space Avenger" (1966)) TV series .... Voices
 Ultraman (1972) (alternate language version of Japanese production "Ultraman: A Special Effects Fantasy Series" (1966)) TV series .... Voices
 Star Blazers (alternate language version of Japanese production "Space Battleship Yamato") (1979–81) TV series .... Voices (25 episodes)
 Thunderbirds 2086 (1982) TV series .... Voices 
 ThunderCats (130 episodes, 1985) .... Voices: Mumm-Ra / Jaga
 The Life & Adventures of Santa Claus (1985) TV special .... Voice of Santa Claus
 The Adventures of the Galaxy Rangers (4 episodes, 1986) .... Voices: Commander Joseph Walsh / Lazarus Slade / Captain Kidd / Wildfire Cody / King Spartos 
 Silverhawks (1986) TV series  .... Voice of Mon*star
 'The Comic Strip (1987) TV series .... Cawfield ("The Mini-Monsters" segment), Walro ("TigerSharks" segment")
 Noel (1992) TV movie .... Voices
 The Twelve Days of Christmas (1993) TV movie .... Voices

Film
 Satan in High Heels (1962) .... Rudy
 Tecnica di un omicidio (a.k.a. Hired Killer) (1966) .... Frank
 Hansu Kurushitan Anderusan no sekai (a.k.a. The World of Hans Christian Andersen) (1971) .... Ducks/Theater Manager
 Sekai Mesaiku Douwa Hakucho no Ouji (a.k.a. The Wild Swans) (1977) .... Voice
 Sekai Mesaiku Douwa Mori wa Ikiteru (a.k.a. Twelve Months) (1980) .... Capt. Rustov
 Thundercats, Ho: The Movie (1985) (voice) .... Jaga / Mumm-Ra / Snarf / Slithe / Vultureman
 Gandahar (a.k.a. Light Years)  (1988) (voice) .... Blaminhoe
 The Secret of Anastasia (1997) .... Tsar Nicholas II
 Buster & Chauncey's Silent Night (1998) .... Additional Voices
 Moses: Egypt's Great Prince (1998) .... Voices

References

External links

1921 births
2002 deaths
American male voice actors
Male actors from New York City
Los Angeles City College alumni
20th-century American male actors
American male film actors
American male radio actors
American male television actors
United States Army personnel of World War II